This is a navigational list of deities exclusively for fictional works, organized primarily by media type then by title of the fiction work, series, franchise or author. This list does not include deities worshiped by humans in real life that appear in fictional works unless they are distinct enough to be mentioned in a Wikipedia article separate from the articles for the entities they are based on.

Literature

The Chronicles of Narnia

Tash – A demon god of Calormen

Dune series

H. P. Lovecraft works 

Azathoth – The Blind Idiot God

J. R. R. Tolkien's legendarium

Eru Ilúvatar – Creator deity of Tolkien's World

Melkor also known as Morgoth Bauglir – An evil fallen deity

Comics

DC Universe
Ares – The Greek god of war
Darkseid – Apokoliptian god of evil
Lords of Chaos and Order – Opposed groups of divine energy beings locked in eternal struggle

Rao – The personification of the red sun of Krypton

Dragon Ball

Haruhi Suzumiya

Marvel Universe

In-Betweener – An incarnation of balance 
Living Tribunal – Serves directly under the supreme being

Thanos - A supervillain, the most powerful of the Titanian Eternals

Oh My Goddess!

Vertigo (different continuity from DC)

Television

Buffyverse

Hercules & Xena

Transformers

Games

Dungeons & Dragons series

Legacy of Kain series

Mortal Kombat series

Ōkami

Tekken

Warhammer Fantasy

See also
Lists of deities
List of demigods in popular fiction

References